Kun en Tigger is a 1912 Danish silent film directed by Holger-Madsen.

Cast
Emma Christiansen ...  Gouvernante
Holger-Madsen ...  Garnle Johan
Alma Lagoni ...  Mary Anne
Lau Lauritzen Sr. ...  Georges Helmer
Holger Pedersen ...  Tjeneren

External links
Danish Film Institute
 

1912 films
Danish silent films
Danish black-and-white films
Films directed by Holger-Madsen